The Movie Trail is a 1921 American short silent Western film directed by Charles Thompson and featuring Hoot Gibson.

Cast
 Hoot Gibson
 John Judd
 Charles Newton
 Marcella Pershing

See also
 Hoot Gibson filmography

External links
 

1921 films
1921 Western (genre) films
1921 short films
American silent short films
American black-and-white films
Silent American Western (genre) films
1920s American films
1920s English-language films